NCAA Basketball: Road to the Final Four 2 (also known as NCAA: Road to the Final Four 2) is a basketball video game. The game is a sequel to NCAA Basketball: Road to the Final Four.

Development
The game was originally scheduled to release in September 1993. The title was produced by Todd Howard.

Reception

References 

1994 video games
Bethesda Softworks games
DOS games
DOS-only games